The 1997–98 season was Kilmarnock's final season in the Scottish Premier Division before the formation of the Scottish Premier League in 1998. Kilmarnock also competed in the Scottish Cup, League Cup and the UEFA Cup Winners' Cup.

Summary

Season
Kilmarnock finished fourth in the Scottish Premier Division with 50 points. They reached the third round of the League Cup, losing to Stirling Albion, and the fourth round of the Scottish Cup, losing to rivals Ayr United. Kilmarnock also competed in the UEFA Cup Winners' Cup, losing to Nice in first round.

Results and fixtures

Kilmarnock's score comes first

Scottish Premier Division

UEFA Cup Winners’ Cup

Scottish League Cup

Scottish Cup

Ayrshire Cup

Final league table

Division summary

Transfers

Players in

Players out

References

External links
 Kilmarnock 1997–98 at Soccerbase.com (select relevant season from dropdown list)

Kilmarnock F.C. seasons
Kilmarnock